Judy Lee Klemesrud (June 11, 1939 – October 12, 1985) was a writer for The New York Times from 1966 until her death in 1985.

Biography
Judy Lee Klemesrud  was born on June 11, 1939 in Thompson, Iowa to Glee Catherine Florence Klemsrud (1909–1986) and Theo Severin Klemesrud (1902–1995).
She had a sister, Candace K. Klemesrud (1947–1989) and a brother, Tom Theo Klemesrud. Her father, who survived both his daughters, owned and published the Thompson Courier and Rake Register in  Winnebago County, Iowa.

She attended the University of Iowa from 1958 until she was graduated in 1961. She later attended the Columbia University School of Journalism. While attending the University of Iowa, she worked as an editor at The Daily Iowan. She then spent four years as a reporter for the Chicago Daily News. She then spent 19 years at The New York Times beginning in 1966, and ending at her death in 1985. She also wrote for such magazines as: Esquire, Cosmopolitan,↵Ladies Home Journal, Redbook, and The New York Times Magazine. In 1968, she signed the "Writers and Editors War Tax Protest" pledge, vowing to refuse tax payments in protest against the Vietnam War.

Judy wrote an op-ed fear mongering piece without any facts or evidence to support her opinions on October 28, 1970 titled "Those Treats May Be Tricks," which sparked a historic nationwide panic towards Halloween candy being poisoned which lasts to contemporary times.

Klemdesrud wrote "Donald Trump, Real Estate Promoter, Builds Image as He Buys Buildings," the first Donald Trump profile, which appeared in the New York Times in November 1976.

Death
Klemesrud died of breast cancer on October 12, 1985 at the age of 46.  She is buried in Rose Hill Cemetery, in her native Thompson.

Awards
She won various awards for her work at The New York Times. These included two "Page One" awards from the Newspaper Guild of New York for her 1973 story,
In a Small Town U.S.A., Women's Lib is Either a Joke or a Rarity, and a 1983 profile on tennis  celebrity Ivan Lendl. In 1969 she won a Front Page Award from the Newspaper Women's Club of New York for a story about adoptions by single women.

References

External links
 Audio tape.  Judy is interviewed about her career
 Judy Klemesrud memorial service audio tape, New York City, 10-29-1985

1939 births
1985 deaths
American women journalists
American tax resisters
Columbia University Graduate School of Journalism alumni
Deaths from breast cancer
Deaths from cancer in New York (state)
The New York Times writers
People from Winnebago County, Iowa
University of Iowa alumni
American people of Norwegian descent
20th-century American non-fiction writers
20th-century American women writers